Voloka may refer to the following places in Chernivtsi Oblast, Ukraine:

 Voloka, Chernivtsi Raion, Chernivtsi Oblast
 Voloka, Vashkivtsi, Vyzhnytsia Raion